Sassuolo is an Italian town, comune, and industrial centre of the Province of Modena in Emilia-Romagna.

Etymology 
The exact origin of the toponym Sassuolo is unclear. One theory is that it might derive from the abundant deposits of petroleum found in the area. This is because petroleum was anciently known as "stone oil" or "olio di sasso" in Italian, from which the composite word Sassuolo (sasso + olio) may have been created.

Another hypothesis is that the name derives from the Latin words saxum solum meaning "rocky soil". This last theory seems to have inspired both the coat of arms and the town's motto - sic ex muricae gemmae - which is Latin for "thus from the rock, buds".

History 
The territory was inhabited in ancient times by the pile-dwelling terramare civilization, then by an Eastern Ligurian tribe - the Friniates - during the Iron Age. The Celt Boii then settled this land around 400 BC, overlapping with the Friniates. The Boii were the most powerful and numerous Celtic tribe of Northern Italy, or Cisalpine Gaul, which they fiercely defended from the Romans.

Although the archeological evidence is scarce, it is hypothesized that a Roman castrum may have been built in the area because of its strategic position.

The first historical mention of the current settlement dates back to 980. In 1039 the town became part of the domains of Boniface of Canossa and was thus inherited by his daughter Matilda in 1076. In 1078, the consuls of Sassuolo swore loyalty to the commune of Modena. When Matilda died in 1115, the town became independent both from Tuscany and Modena.

In 1373, the city was given to the Este family at the request of the citizens themselves, in exchange for the right to extract water from the river Secchia. The town was then ruled by the Este family until 1499, when it became the capital of the homonymous signoria ruled by the house of Pio. In 1599 the signoria was directly annexed to the Duchy of Modena and Reggio of which it remained a possession until the Italian Unification.

From 1861 onwards, Sassuolo grew both in size and population.

During the Second World War, immediately after the Armistice of Cassibile was made public on September 8, 1943, Sassuolo was swiftly occupied by German troops. The occupation was met with strong resistance from the civilian population, until the town was liberated on April 23, 1945, on Saint George's Day, by the Brazilian Expeditionary Force.

Geography
Located in the central-western area of its province, at the border with Reggio Emilia, Sassuolo borders with the municipalities of Casalgrande (RE), Castellarano (RE), Fiorano Modenese, Formigine, Prignano sulla Secchia and Serramazzoni. It counts the hamlets (frazioni) of Montegibbio, Salvarola Terme and San Michele dei Mucchietti.

Main sights

 The Ducal palace of Sassuolo, designed by architect Bartolomeo Avanzini in 1634. In 1638–56 parts of the interior was frescoed by the French Baroque painter Jean Boulanger. Angelo Michele Colonna, Agostino Mitelli, Baldassare Bianchi and Giovanni Giacomo Monti were also invited by Boulanger to work on the palace decoration. Luca Colombi, Giovanni Lazzoni, Lattanzio Maschio, Guercino, Salvator Rosa, Ludovico Lana also contributed. At ground level is a large pool surrounded by ruins, called il Fontanazzo (broadly "the large fountain").
The church and convent of San Giuseppe. 
The castle of Montegibbio, originally constructed in 920 and destroyed in 1325 and 1501, only to be then rebuilt in 1636.

Economy 
The industrial growth of Sassuolo began in the 1950s.  Eighty percent of all Italian ceramic tiles are produced here, with more than 300 ceramic factories operating in the Sassuolo district (as Marazzi Group, Refin and Marca Corona,). The city is currently the centre of Italian tile industry and one of the most important tile producers in the world.

People
Pierangelo Bertoli (1942–2002), singer
Andrea Bertolini (born 1973), racing car driver
Caterina Caselli (born 1946), singer
Fabrizio Giovanardi (born 1966), racing car driver
Giuseppe Medici (1907–2000), politician
Andrea Montermini (born 1964), racing car driver
Leo Morandi (1923–2009), inventor, ceramist
Filippo "Nek" Neviani (born 1972), singer-songwriter
Graziano Pattuzzi (born 1955), politician
Camillo Ruini (born 1931), cardinal
Alessandro Conti (born 1980), singer, artist

Sport 
Sassuolo is the home town of Serie A side U.S. Sassuolo Calcio; it also includes the stadium Stadio Enzo Ricci. However, the team no longer play games in the city, having moved first to Stadio Alberto Braglia in Modena which was Sassuolo's temporary home while playing in Serie B from 2008 and subsequently to Reggio Emilia at the renovated Stadio Città del Tricolore (formerly Stadio Giglio) in a venue-sharing agreement with Lega Pro Prima Divisione club Reggiana.
Upon their promotion to Serie A in 2013 U.S. Sassuolo Calcio; joined a select group of teams not belonging to a provincial capital city: Empoli, Legnano, Pro Patria, Carpi and Casale.

Volley Sassuolo is the local volleyball team.

The Memorial Argo Manfredini tennis tournament is played in the city.

Typical products 
Sassolino – anise liqueur
Tiramolla - caramelized sugar exclusively sold during Holy Thursday

Twin towns
 Irsina, Italy
 Lucoli, Italy (since 2011)

References

External links

Visit Sassuolo Tourism Informations
City homepage
Sassuolo 2000
Sassuolo on-line 

 
Cities and towns in Emilia-Romagna